Sára Luca Bácskai (born 20 June 1999) is a Hungarian short track speed skater. She competed in the 2018 Winter Olympics.

References

1999 births
Living people
Hungarian female short track speed skaters
Olympic short track speed skaters of Hungary
Short track speed skaters at the 2018 Winter Olympics
21st-century Hungarian women